A suicide pact is an agreed plan between two or more individuals to commit suicide.

Suicide Pact also may refer to:

Titled works 
 Albums:
 Suicide Pact – You First (1999), by band Therapy?
 Suicide Pact (2012), by JJAMZ
 Track title in the album The Mountain Will Fall (2016) of DJ Shadow 
 South Korean film A Blood Pledge (2009), AKA Suicide Pact

Other uses 
 "Suicide pact", metaphor (in slogan "The Constitution is not a suicide pact") for legal claims construed as willfully at odds with all established theories of U.S. constitutional law